Profile is second release and first full-length album by the British rock band Githead, issued in 2005.

Track listing
"Alpha" – 5:54
"My LCA (Little Box of Magic)" – 3:50
"Cosmology for Beginners" – 4:25
"Antiphon" – 4:46
"They Are" – 3:39
"Option Paralysis" – 5:26
"Wallpaper" – 5:40
"Raining Down" – 7:14
"Pylons" – 3:27

Personnel
 Colin Newman - vocals, guitar
 Malka Spigel - bass, vocals
 Max Franken - drums
 Robin Rimbaud - guitar

References

2005 albums
Githead albums
Swim (record label) albums